Wormburner is an indie rock band based in Brooklyn, New York. Their music has been categorized as college rock. The band has five members, and is led by Steve "Hank" Henry, who is the band's singer, guitarist, and songwriter. Henry graduated from Colgate University in 1993. Their debut album, A Hero's Welcome, was released in 2006 and produced by David Lowery of Cracker. The band wrote and recorded the album's 12 songs at Lowery's studio in Richmond, Virginia. These songs' power-pop sound, along with a series of live shows by the band, led to the band and album becoming increasingly popular. The band released its second album, Placed by the Gideons, in 2010 on the label Wax Off, which is partly run by WSUM host DJ Renton. In 2012, the band was interviewed for MTV's series 120 Minutes. In November 2013, Wormburner opened for Violent Femmes at Roseland Ballroom in New York City. Their third album, Pleasant Living in Planned Communities, was released on Dive Records in September 2014. Prior to its release, a song from the album, "Somewhere Else to Be", was premiered by Brooklyn Magazine. Robert Christgau gave Pleasant Living in Planned Communities an A− grade, writing that on the album, "Hank Henry doesn't swallow a word as he shouts his tuneful tales into the void, and unlike Craig Finn [of the Hold Steady], he doesn't specialize in or even much notice the human dregs and heroes of the alt-rock scene."

Discography
A Hero's Welcome (Dive, 2006)
Placed by the Gideons (Wax Off, 2010)
Pleasant Living in Planned Communities (Dive, 2014)

References

External links

Musical groups from Brooklyn
American indie rock groups